Richard Parkes Bonington (25 October 1802 – 23 September 1828) was an English Romantic landscape painter, who moved to France at the age of 14 and can also be considered as a French artist, and an intermediary bringing aspects of English style to France. Becoming, after his early death, one of the most influential British artists of his time, the facility of his style was inspired by the old masters, yet was entirely modern in its application. His landscapes were mostly of coastal scenes, with a low horizon and large sky, showing a brilliant handling of light and atmosphere. He also painted small historical cabinet paintings in a freely-handled version of the troubadour style.

Life and work

Richard Parkes Bonington was born in the town of Arnold, four miles from Nottingham. His father also known as Richard was successively a gaoler, a drawing master and lace-maker, and his mother a teacher. Bonington learned watercolour painting from his father and exhibited paintings at the Liverpool Academy at the age of eleven.

In 1817, Bonington's family moved to Calais, France, where his father had set up a lace factory. At this time, Bonington started taking lessons from the painter François Louis Thomas Francia, who, having recently returned from England, where he had been deeply influenced by the work of Thomas Girtin, taught him the English watercolour technique. In 1818, the Bonington family moved to Paris to open a lace shop. There he met and became friends with Eugène Delacroix. He worked for a time producing copies of Dutch and Flemish landscapes in the Louvre. In 1820, he started attending the École des Beaux-Arts in Paris, where he studied under Antoine-Jean, Baron Gros.

It was around this time that Bonington started going on sketching tours in the suburbs of Paris and the surrounding countryside. His first paintings were exhibited at the Paris Salon in 1822. He also began to work in oils and lithography, illustrating Baron Taylor's Voyages pittoresques dans l'ancienne France and his own architectural series Restes et Fragmens. In 1824, he won a gold medal at the Paris Salon along with John Constable and Anthony Vandyke Copley Fielding, and spent most of the year painting coastal views in Dunkirk.

In 1825 he met Delacroix on a visit with Alexandre-Marie Colin to London, and they sketched together there, and shared a studio for some months in Paris on their return; Delacroix influenced him in turning to historical painting. He also developed a technique mixing watercolour with gouache and gum, achieving an effect close to oil painting.  In 1826 he visited northern Italy, staying in Venice for a month, and London again in 1827–8. In late 1828 his tuberculosis worsened and his parents sent him back to London for treatment. Bonington died of tuberculosis on 23 September 1828 at 29 Tottenham Street in London, aged 25. He was buried in the graveyard of St James's Chapel Pentonville and in 1837 his remains were transferred to Kensal Green Cemetery to be re-interred with his parents.

Reputation

Delacroix paid tribute to Bonington's work in a letter to Théophile Thoré in 1861. It reads, in part:
When I met him for the first time, I too was very young and was making studies in the Louvre: this was around 1816 or 1817... Already in this genre (watercolor), which was an English novelty at that time, he had an astonishing ability... To my mind, one can find in other modern artists qualities of strength and of precision in rendering that are superior to those in Bonington's pictures, but no one in this modern school, and perhaps even before, has possessed that lightness of touch which, especially in watercolours, makes his works a type of diamond which flatters and ravishes the eye, independently of any subject and any imitation.

To Laurence Binyon however, "Bonington's extraordinary technical gift was also his enemy. There is none of the interest of struggle in his painting."

Beyond his watercolors, Bonington is known for his drawings with graphite pencil, particularly his elaborate cityscapes.

Bonington had a number of close followers, such as Roqueplan and Isabey in France, and Thomas Shotter Boys, James Holland, William Callow and John Scarlett Davis in England. In addition, there were many copies and forgeries of his work made in the period immediately after his death.

A statue to him was erected outside the Nottingham School of Art by Watson Fothergill, and a theatre and primary school in his home town of Arnold are named after him. In addition, the house in which he was born (79 High Street, Arnold) is now named 'Bonington House' and is Grade II listed. The Wallace Collection has an especially large group of 35 works, representing both his landscapes and history paintings.

Gallery

References and sources

References

Sources

Cambridge, M (2002). Richard Parkes Bonington: Young and Romantic. Nottingham: Nottingham Castle  (Catalogue of exhibition at Nottingham Castle Museum in 2002; contains an account of the life and works that includes many references.)
Ingamells, John, The Wallace Collection, Catalogue of Pictures, Vol I, British, German, Italian, Spanish, Wallace Collection, 1985,

Further reading
Noon, P (2009). Richard Parkes Bonington : the complete paintings.  New Haven, Yale University Press.

See also

 List of Orientalist artists
 Orientalism

External links

 Handprint.com – Biography by Bruce MacEvoy. Retrieved 17 November 2004.
Works by Bonington in the Tate Gallery
Works by Bonington in the Wallace Collection

1802 births
1828 deaths
19th-century English painters
19th-century deaths from tuberculosis
Artists from Nottingham
Burials at Kensal Green Cemetery
English male painters
English romantic painters
English watercolourists
Tuberculosis deaths in England
Landscape artists
Orientalism
Orientalist painters
People from Arnold, Nottinghamshire
Pupils of Antoine-Jean Gros